Anatoli Grigoryevich Tebloyev (born July 16, 1974) is a Russian retired professional footballer. His last club was Gabala.

Career statistics

Honours
 Neftchi Baku
 Azerbaijan Premier League champion: 2004–05

References 

1974 births
Living people
Sportspeople from Arkhangelsk
Russian footballers
Russian Premier League players
Russian expatriate footballers
Expatriate footballers in Azerbaijan
FC Anzhi Makhachkala players
FC Spartak Vladikavkaz players
FC Volgar Astrakhan players
FC Oryol players
Gabala FC players
FC Irtysh Omsk players
Association football midfielders
Neftçi PFK players
FC Znamya Truda Orekhovo-Zuyevo players
FC Mashuk-KMV Pyatigorsk players